See No Evil, Hear No Evil is a 1989 American comedy film directed by Arthur Hiller. The film stars Richard Pryor as a blind man and Gene Wilder as a deaf man who work together to thwart a trio of murderous thieves. This is the third film (in a series of four) featuring Wilder and Pryor, who had appeared previously in the 1976 film Silver Streak and the 1980 film Stir Crazy. The film was released in the United States on May 12, 1989.

Released to a mixed to negative critical reception, See No Evil... was the comic duo's last financially successful film as a screen couple. Their next film together, 1991's Another You, was a box office failure as well as a critical one, and it proved to be the last collaboration of Pryor and Wilder.

Plot
Wallace "Wally" Karew (Richard Pryor), a blind man, and David "Dave" Lyons (Gene Wilder), a deaf man, meet when Wally applies for a job in Dave's New York City concession shop.

After a brief period of confusion and antagonism, Wally and Dave become close friends. Dave reads lips and guides Wally when they travel, and Wally tells Dave about invisible sources of sound and what people say behind his back. At a local bar, Wally defeats an aggressive bully in a fistfight with assistance from Dave, who uses clock-face directions to tell Wally where his opponent is. Dave hires Wally.

One morning, as Wally waits outside for the day's newspapers, a man walks into Dave's shop. When the man is approached by a beautiful woman named Eve (Joan Severance), he quickly removes a gold coin from a suitcase and places it in a box of coins sitting on the counter. The woman takes the suitcase and shoots the man in the stomach as Dave - whose back is turned - reads the information on a box of antacid pills. Dave neither sees nor hears the shooting, but he notices Eve's legs as she leaves the shop. Wally, who heard the gunshot, walks into the shop and trips over the man's dead body.  Dave then rushes to help Wally and picks up the gun, which Eve left at the scene. When the police arrive, they find Dave and Wally standing over the body with Dave holding the gun. Before they are arrested, Dave tells Wally to collect the coins from the box.

At the police station, Dave and Wally are interrogated by Captain Emile Braddock (Alan North), a detective who immediately takes a dislike to them and makes them his prime suspects due to their relative uselessness as witnesses. When Eve and her accomplice Kirgo (Kevin Spacey) - hoping to recover the coin - arrive to bail them out by posing as attorneys, Wally recognizes Eve's perfume and Dave recognizes her legs, but Braddock ignores them when they insist that she is the killer. Wishing to avoid Eve and Kirgo when they are released, Dave and Wally escape from the police station, but the criminals soon find them. Eve takes the coin from Wally's pocket and telephones her boss Mr. Sutherland (Anthony Zerbe) for instructions, allowing Dave to learn the criminals' plans by reading her lips. When Kirgo tries to kill Dave and Wally, they use the fistfighting method they learned in the bar to knock him unconscious. They then steal an unattended police car, and drive away with Eve, Kirgo and Braddock chasing them. Working together to guide the patrol car, Dave and Wally evade both the police and the criminals, but they accidentally launch the car onto a waterborne garbage barge.

After hiding the police car, the two men walk to a motel and telephone Wally's sister Adele (Kirsten Childs) for help. The police follow Adele and search her motel room, but she, Wally, and Dave avoid detection, and they drive away after the police have left. Having incorrectly read Eve's lips, Dave believes they need to find a woman named "Grace George", but Adele realizes that Eve must have been referring to a resort called "Great Gorge". At the resort Wally impersonates a visiting professor. Meanwhile, Dave sneaks into the resort room to steal the coin from Eve. While Dave is digging through her bag Eve comes out of the shower wearing only a towel. Dave gets a huge erection and Eve mistakes it for a gun. Realizing this, Dave makes Eve raise her hands and drop the towel leaving her completely naked. Dave then looks Eve over and slips out of the room. Meanwhile, Adele distracts Kirgo by crashing her car into his. However, Kirgo and Eve kidnap Adele and take her to Sutherland's estate.

After a mishap with the car, Dave and Wally put their rescue plan into action, with the result that Adele escapes but the two men are captured. In his study, Sutherland – who is also blind – reveals that the coin is a room-temperature superconductor, which is extremely valuable. Kirgo and Sutherland are killed during an argument over sharing the profits from the coin's theft, after which Dave and Wally escape the study and have a violent altercation with Eve and her helicopter pilot. When the police arrive, the remaining criminals are arrested, and Wally and Dave are released having been cleared of the charges. Dave promises to wait for Eve when she gets out of prison. Shortly thereafter, the two men go to a local park and reprise a scene from the beginning of the film by dumping ice-cream cones on each other's head, enjoying each other's company.

Cast
 Richard Pryor as Wallace "Wally" Karew
 Gene Wilder as David "Dave" Lyons
 Joan Severance as Eve
 Kevin Spacey as Kirgo
 Alan North as Captain Emile Braddock
 Anthony Zerbe as Sutherland
 Louis Giambalvo as Lieutenant Gatlin
 Kirsten Childs as Adele Karew
 John Capodice as Scotto
 George Bartenieff as Huddelston

Production 
Joseph Bologna and Renée Taylor wrote the first screenplay of the film and sold it to Columbia Pictures for $200,000 in 1984. They later sued the studio in the Los Angeles County Superior Court for $10 million in damages after being denied the promised additional $500,000 to be paid if Pryor were cast in the film, $25,000 per revision, and five-percent profit. Originally Jim Belushi was to be cast as the deaf man before Wilder was hired. Principal photography began on August 29, 1988, in New York and New Jersey, with New York City, Pound Ridge, and the Hackensack River marshlands serving as locations.

Reception

Critical response
TriStar Pictures was looking to produce another film starring Wilder and Pryor, but Wilder would only agree to do See No Evil, Hear No Evil if he was allowed to re-write the script. The studio agreed and See No Evil, Hear No Evil premiered in May 1989 to mostly negative reviews. Many critics praised Wilder's, Pryor's, and Kevin Spacey's performances, but they mostly agreed that the script was absolutely terrible. Roger Ebert called it "a real dud", the Deseret Morning News described the film as "stupid", with an "idiotic" script that had a "contrived" story and "too many juvenile gags". On the other hand, Vincent Canby called it "by far the most successful co-starring vehicle for Mr. Pryor and Mr. Wilder", while also acknowledging that "this is not elegant movie making, and not all of the gags are equally clever."

The film holds a 27% rating on Rotten Tomatoes from 30 critics. Despite the negative reviews, the film was a box office success, able to stay at number one for two weeks.

See also
Gene Wilder filmography
Kevin Spacey filmography
List of films featuring the deaf and hard of hearing
Richard Pryor filmography

References

External links

 

1989 films
1989 comedy films
1980s American films
1980s buddy comedy films
1980s crime comedy films
1980s English-language films
American buddy comedy films
American crime comedy films
American slapstick comedy films
Films about blind people
Films about deaf people
Films about disability
Films about friendship
Films about murderers
Films directed by Arthur Hiller
Films scored by Stewart Copeland
Films set in Manhattan
Films set in New Jersey
Films shot in New York City
Films shot in New York (state)
Films shot in New Jersey
Films with screenplays by Gene Wilder
TriStar Pictures films